The Iowa Waltz is an album by folk singer/guitarist Greg Brown. It was re-issued in 1984 by Red House Records. It was their very first release, carrying the issue number "01" of the newly formed label.

Reception

Writing for Allmusic, music critic David Freedlander wrote of the album "As sweet as a watermelon on a hot summer afternoon, and as a beautifully simple as dusty country road, Greg Brown's Iowa Waltz shows the man who later was to become one of the greatest folk singers of his generation at his earliest and most casually sublime... If Iowa Waltz doesn't stir your soul, then check your pulse."

Track listing
All songs by Greg Brown
 "The Iowa Waltz" – 3:50
 "Mississippi Serenade" – 3:35
 "Counting Feedcaps" – 3:27
 "Grand Junction" – 3:03
 "Out in the Country" – 7:33
 "Walking the Beans" – 3:40
 "My Home in the Sky" – 3:40
 "King Corn" – 6:13
 "Daughters" – 4:10
 "Four Wet Pigs" – 1:54
 "The Train Carrying Jimmie Rodgers Home" – 3:24

Personnel
Greg Brown – vocals, guitar
Dave Hansen – bass
Dave Moore – harmonica
Al Murphy – fiddle
Mike Watts – drums
John Welstead – drums
David Williams – banjo, guitar, mandolin

Production
Produced by Greg Brown and Steven Henke
Engineered and mixed by David Welstead
Photography by Jerome Goedkin

References

Greg Brown (folk musician) albums
1981 albums